Everett's white-eye (Zosterops everetti) is a bird species in the disputed family Zosteropidae, which might belong with the Old World babblers (Timaliidae). The name commemorates British colonial administrator and zoological collector Alfred Hart Everett.

Distribution and habitat
It is restricted to the Talaud Islands, Sulu Archipelago and the Philippines. Its natural habitats are subtropical or tropical moist lowland forests and subtropical or tropical moist montane forests.

References

Everett's white-eye
Birds of Sulawesi
Birds of the Philippines
Sulu Archipelago
Everett's white-eye
Taxonomy articles created by Polbot